The Somali Dervish was an epic film directed by Said Salah and Amar Sneh between 1983 and 1985. It is one of the few full-length feature films to have been produced in Somalia.

With a budget of $1.8 million, the 4-hour-and-40-minute epic followed the life of Muhammad Abdullah Hassan, emir of Darawiish sultan Diiriye Guure of the revolutionary Darawiish anti-colonialists. Seven languages were used for film dialogue: Somali, Arabic, Italian, English, and three regional dialects. The movie included an actual descendant of Mohammed Abdullah Hassan as its star, Sheikh Osman Mohamoud Omar, and featured hundreds of actors and extras. Once thought to be lost, the movie was found in the National Film Archive of India in late 2019.

References

External links
 
 Darwiishka Soomaaliyeed

1985 films
English-language Somalian films
English-language Indian films
English-language Italian films
Somalian drama films
Indian drama films
Italian drama films
1985 drama films
1980s Italian films